Karl Ernst Ulrich de Maizière (24 February 1912 – 26 August 2006) was a German general. He served in the army of three German states: the Reichswehr of the Weimar Republic, the  Wehrmacht of Nazi Germany, and the German Army of West Germany, with a total of 32 years in uniform, the last five as Inspector General of the Bundeswehr. He retired in 1972 at the age of sixty and lived in retirement until his death in August 2006.

Early life and early military career
Maizière was born in Stade on 24 February 1912 to Walter de Maizière, who was a jurist by profession, and Elsbeth (née Dückers). His family was of Huguenot origin, having fled from France in the 1700s. He grew up in Hanover and received his high school certificate in 1930 before joining the Reichswehr in Stettin. From 1931 to 1933 he was at an infantry school in Dresden was promoted several times in the next few years, eventually becoming a captain in 1939.

Second World War and later military career
Maizière took part in the Invasion of Poland and Eastern Front, as an aide to General Adolf Heusinger. In this time he was promoted to lieutenant colonel. Upon the surrender of Germany, he  went into British captivity and lived as a civilian from his release to 1955, when he joined the German Army of the new Bundeswehr and worked in the Federal Ministry of Defence (Colonel).

1 April 1962 he became commander of the military academy of the German Armed forces (major general). 1 October 1964 Inspector of the Army (lieutenant general)  and 25 August 1966 the fourth Inspector General of the Bundeswehr (General officer), succeeding Heusinger, holding the position from 1966 to 1972. In 1967 Maizière formally congratulated Field Marshal Erich von Manstein at his 80th birthday. He retired 31 March 1972 succeeded by Armin Zimmermann. 
During his retirement he wrote the books: Führen im Frieden - 20 Jahre Dienst für bundeswehr und Staat ("Leading in Freedom: 20 Years Served for Federal Defence and State")(1974) and In der Pflicht - Lebensbericht eines deutschen Soldaten im 20. Jahrhundert ("In Duty - Life Report of a German Soldier in the 20th Century")(1989).

His brother Clemens de Maizière decided to stay in the Soviet-occupied part of Germany and became one of the founding members of the CDU (Ost), his nephew Lothar de Maizière was the last Prime Minister of the German Democratic Republic (East Germany), while his son Thomas de Maizière served as Federal Minister of Defence as well as Federal Minister of the Interior.

He belonged to a noble family of French Huguenot origin, originally from Maizières-lès-Metz.

Dates of Rank 
 Leutnant (Lieutenant)- 1 August 1933
 Oberleutnant (Senior lieutenant)- 1 October 1935
 Hauptmann (Captain)- 1 April 1939
 Major (Major)- 1 April 1942
 Oberstleutnant (Lieutenant colonel)- 1 June 1943
 Oberst (Colonel)- 1955
 Generalmajor (Major general)- 1 April 1962
 Generalleutnant (Lieutenant general)- 1 October 1964
 General (General)- 25 August 1966

References

External links

 Biography on BMVg website

1912 births
2006 deaths
Bundeswehr generals
German Army officers of World War II
Grand Crosses with Star and Sash of the Order of Merit of the Federal Republic of Germany
Ulrich
People from the Province of Hanover
Inspectors General of the Bundeswehr
Generals of the German Army
Commandants of the Bundeswehr Command and Staff College
People from Stade
Military personnel from Lower Saxony